Elections to the Zetland County Council were held on 8 May 1973 as part of Scottish local elections.  This was the last election for the County Council before its incorporation along with the Lerwick Town Council into the Shetland Islands Council in 1975.  Elections were held in every part of Shetland except Lerwick to elect 24 landward members to the County Council, who would be joined by nine nominated members from the Lerwick Town Council.

The election saw an unusually partisan competition between supporters and opponents of the County Council's policy on North Sea oil.  The Shetland Democratic Group was formed to oppose the council's attempts to gain private legislation to exert direct control over oil developments in Shetland, objecting to proposals that would allow the council to take equity in industrial development and gain compulsory purchase powers.

The Shetland Democratic Group gained 11 seats and defeated incumbent Convener Edward Thomason but failed to win enough support to gain control of the Zetland County Council.  Supporters of the council's policy elected George Blance, a nominated member from the Lerwick Town Council, as the council's final Convener, defeating Shetland Democratic Group member John Jamieson by 18 votes to 12.  The council's continued support for private legislation led to the passage of the Zetland County Council Act 1974, providing the council with powers to become a harbour authority, control harbour developments, invest in securities of bodies corporate, implement compulsory purchases in specified areas relating to oil developments and to establish a reserve fund from oil revenues.  These powers would be inherited by the Shetland Islands Council in 1975.

13 seats were uncontested, including seven of the Shetland Democratic Group's 11 gains.

Election results

Ward Results

By-elections since 1973

References

Zetland
Shetland Islands Council elections